Fuse is a Canadian radio program, which aired on CBC Radio One, CBC Radio 2 and CBC Radio 3. Premiering in 2005, each week the program paired two (and occasionally three or more) Canadian musicians for an hour-long concert in which the artists collaborated on a mix of material by all of the involved artists as well as cover songs.

History

Fuse first aired in 2005 as a summer program by the producers of Bandwidth, the network's regional arts and culture program in Ontario. It aired following Vinyl Tap, taking over the final hour of Finkleman's 45s' timeslot.

The show completed its original run in October 2005, and was replaced by the weekend edition of The National Playlist. After National Playlist was cancelled, Fuse rejoined the CBC schedule in the spring of 2006.

The program's original host, Amanda Putz, moved with her husband to Hong Kong in the fall of 2006. She was replaced by former Ontario Today host Alan Neal. Putz returned to the program in September 2007.

The program's pairing of Gord Downie with The Sadies led them to collaborate on the 2014 album And the Conquering Sun.

Performers
 Randy Bachman and Tal Bachman
 Leslie Feist and Kathleen Edwards
 Joel Plaskett and Tom Wilson
 Kiran Ahluwalia and Mighty Popo
 Lynn Miles and Jim Bryson
 Buck 65 and Sarah Slean
 The Golden Dogs and The Golden Seals
 Jenny Whiteley and Stephen Fearing
 Gentleman Reg, Andy Kim and Danny Michel
 Ron Sexsmith and Sam Roberts
 Hawksley Workman and Choclair
 Andy Stochansky and Andrew McPherson
 Colin Linden and Alana Levandoski
 Ridley Bent, Ndidi Onukwulu and Madagascar Slim
 Agnostic Mountain Gospel Choir and Sarah Dugas & Andrina Turenne
 Carolyn Mark and Great Lake Swimmers
 Lily Frost and Hilotrons
 Julie Doiron and The Superfantastics
 Jill Barber, Matthew Barber, Bryden Baird, Jesse Baird and Jay Baird
 Torngat and Patrick Watson
 Andre Ethier and Sandro Perri
 Kids on TV and Ohbijou
 Jim Cuddy and Oh Susanna
 Final Fantasy and Cadence Weapon
 Apostle of Hustle and Tagaq
 Jon-Rae and the River and Anne Lindsay
 Emm Gryner and D.D. Jackson
 Royal Wood and Priya Thomas
 Blackie and the Rodeo Kings and Murray McLauchlan
 Amy Millan and Luke Doucet
 Henri Fabergé and the Adorables and Abdominal
 The Sadies and Gord Downie

References

CBC Radio One programs
CBC Music programs
CBC Radio 3 programs
Canadian music radio programs
2005 radio programme debuts